FIS Freestyle Junior World Ski Championships are the Junior World Championships in freestyle skiing organized by the International Ski Federation (FIS). With the exception of Ski Cross, participation in Junior World Ski Championships is limited to competitors whose age is between fourteen and nineteen in the calendar year of the Championship. Ski Cross is limited to competitors between the ages of sixteen and twenty.

Hosts

Men's events

Aerials

Moguls

Dual moguls

Ski cross

Halfpipe

Slopestyle

Big air

Women's events

Aerials

Moguls

Dual moguls

Ski cross

Halfpipe

Slopestyle

Big air

Mixed events

Team aerials

Team ski cross

All-time medal table
Updated after 2021 edition (Krasnoyarsk).

Most successful athletes
Updated after 2021 edition (Krasnoyarsk).

Men

Women

See also
 FIS Freestyle World Ski Championships
 FIS Snowboarding Junior World Championships

References

External links
International Ski Federation - Calendar & Results

International Ski Federation competitions
World youth sports competitions
Freestyle skiing competitions
Freestyle Junior